Rolanda Hollis is an American politician. She serves as a Democratic member of the Alabama House of Representatives for the 58th district. She replaced Oliver Robinson in the seat.

Arrest for domestic violence
The Northwest Florida Daily News and other outlets reported that Hollis was arrested for domestic violence at the Inn on Destin Harbor in Destin, Florida on September 22, 2019. Responding police found "obvious signs of a disturbance, including broken glass", and a witness reported seeing Hollis shoving her husband, Aaron Jefferson, at approximately 11 PM. Hollis and her husband denied there was a physical altercation, although Hollis admitted to throwing a glass. Hollis was arrested and released the next day from Okaloosa County Jail after posting bail on Monday September 23, 2019.

Compulsory sterilization legislation
In 2020, Hollis introduced HB 238, a bill that would require all males to undergo sterilization by vasectomy after the birth of their third child or prior to their 50th birthday, whichever comes first. Men would be required to pay for the procedure themselves.  Hollis claimed that her plan for forced sterilizations of men would “neutralize" the Alabama Human Life Protection Act, a bill restricting abortion which was made law in 2019.

References

External links

Living people
Democratic Party members of the Alabama House of Representatives
African-American state legislators in Alabama
Women state legislators in Alabama
21st-century American politicians
21st-century American women politicians
Place of birth missing (living people)
Year of birth missing (living people)
Tuskegee University alumni